Point La Haye was a small town charted by Captain James Cook in 1770. It had 12 families. The first Postmistress was Mrs. Edward Mandville in 1951.

See also
 List of communities in Newfoundland and Labrador

Populated places in Newfoundland and Labrador